GAVI, officially Gavi, the Vaccine Alliance (previously the GAVI Alliance, and before that the Global Alliance for Vaccines and Immunization) is a public–private global health partnership with the goal of increasing access to immunization in poor countries. In 2016, Gavi channeled more than half of total donor assistance for health, and most donor assistance for immunization, by monetary measure.

Gavi supports the immunization of almost half the world's children. Gavi has helped immunize over 760 million children, preventing over 13 million deaths worldwide, helping increase diphtheria vaccine coverage in supported countries from 59% in 2000 to 81% in 2019, contributing to reducing child mortality by half. It also seeks to improve the economics of vaccines, negotiating bulk prices, supporting price discrimination, and reducing the commercial risks that manufacturers face when selling vaccines to the poor and developing vaccines. It also provides funding to strengthen health systems and train health workers across the developing world, though the effectiveness of its health-system-strengthening programs is disputed.

Along with Global Health Initiatives (GHIs) in general, Gavi was described as innovative, effective, and less bureaucratic than multilateral government institutions like the WHO. Gavi programmes may produce quantified results within an election cycle, which is appealing to parties locked in an election cycle. One author described Gavi's approach to public health as business-oriented and technology-focused, using market-oriented measures, and seeking quantifiable results. Gavi follows a model termed the "Gates approach" or US-type approach. It contrasts with the approach typified by the Alma Ata Declaration, which focuses on the effects of political, social, and cultural systems on health.

Gavi facilitates vaccinations in developing countries by working with donor governments, the World Health Organization, UNICEF, the World Bank, the vaccine industry in both industrialised and developing countries, research and technical agencies, civil society, the Bill & Melinda Gates Foundation and other private philanthropists. Gavi has observer status at the World Health Assembly. GAVI has been criticized for giving private donors more unilateral power to decide on global health goals, prioritizing new, expensive vaccines while putting less money and effort into expanding coverage of old, cheap ones, harming local healthcare systems, spending too much on subsidies to large, profitable pharmaceutical companies without reducing the prices of some vaccines, and its conflicts of interest in having vaccine manufacturers on its governance board. Gavi has taken steps to address some of these concerns.

Sponsors

Gavi runs in five-year funding cycles which enables it to negotiate long-term deals with manufacturers, secure in the knowledge that funding will be available.

Following the latest Global Vaccine Summit in June 2020 hosted in the UK, $8.8 billion (USD) was raised for the funding cycle 2021 to 2025; exceeding the target of $7.4 billion. This included $2 billion from the UK, $1.6 billion from the Gates Foundation and $1 billion from Norway.

The UK government stated that this round of funding would mean that 300 million more children in lower-income countries are immunized for diseases including measles, polio and diphtheria by the end of 2025. Additionally, the funding will support health systems to withstand the impact of coronavirus and maintain the infrastructure necessary to roll out a future COVID-19 vaccine on a global scale.

In the period of 2016–2020 over which US$9.3 billion had been received by Gavi, the UK was the largest donor, providing around 25% of total funding, with the Bill & Melinda Gates Foundation (BMGF), the US and Norway close behind.

Industrialised countries are GAVI's principal donors, providing approximately three-quarters of the total funding. All donor governments are represented on the Gavi Board through a constituency system (i.e. one donor country will represent several donors in their constituency).

Public-sector workers and academics public health have criticized Gavi, and other global health initiatives (GHIs) with private-sector actors, saying that they have neither the democratic legitimacy nor the capacity to decide on public health agendas. Private donors often find it easier to exert influence through public-private partnerships like Gavi than through the traditional public sector. There is also criticism that staff at GHIs are often recruited directly from elite educational institutions, and have no experience in health care systems, especially those in poorer countries. Some WHO officials have privately criticized Gavi for infringing and weakening the WHO's mandate.

History and programs
Gavi was created in 2000 as a successor to the Children's Vaccine Initiative, which was launched in 1990. In August 2014, Gavi changed its name from "GAVI Alliance" and rebranded itself with a new logo deliberately reminiscent of UN organization logos, but using green as a mark of difference.

Vaccine development and advance market commitments
Advance Market Commitments (AMCs) aim to overcome market failure by making an advance pledge that if a vaccine for a certain condition is developed, meeting certain specifications, donors will buy a certain number of doses. GAVI seeks to design its AMCs in a way that encourages a competitive market.

GAVI has been particularly successful at promoting the uptake of newer vaccines.

Vaccination programs

GAVI's main objective is vaccination programs. Gavi has been the main donor funder of vaccination in low and middle income countries.

In 2012, the first Médecins Sans Frontières (MSF) "The right shot" report criticized Gavi for focusing on funding expensive new vaccines and neglecting to give children low-cost older ones. "Twenty percent of the world's children aren't even getting the basic vaccines", MSF's vaccine policy adviser said. MSF criticized the Global Vaccine Action Plan (GVAP), a WHO global collaboration of which Gavi is listed as a leader, as flawed for failing to help those 20%, which is some 19 million children.

Pneumococcal vaccine
In 2011, Doctors Without Borders (MSF) recommended that Gavi change the ways in which it buy vaccines. They criticized the pneumococcal vaccine Advance Market Commitment, which means that GlaxoSmithKline (GSK) and Pfizer get a subsidy as well as a per-unit payment for supplying doses of pneumococcal vaccine, as "corporate welfare that is scandalously expensive to donors and taxpayers" (in return, the companies committed to sell at least 30 million doses annually for ten years).

The Advance Market Commitment had transferred far more money to GSK and Pfizer than the GAVI grants had transferred to low-cost suppliers for technology transfer and product development. MSF said that large pharmaceutical multinationals had been found to put very high markups on prices, and internationally certified vaccine could be made for about 40% less cost by smaller companies in India and China, despite patent-related obstacles. The duopoly allowed price discrimination; apart from charging slightly higher prices for GAVI, it charged unaffordable prices (about ten time the GAVI price) for middle-income countries too rich for GAVI aid. MSF also highlighted the success of the adapted vaccines program, which makes vaccines that are easier to deliver in remote areas (no need for a temperature-controlled supply chain, looser age restrictions, fewer shots, lower prices, etc.). They recommended that GAVI spend more money on adapted vaccines and on fostering competition, and less subsidizing large pharmaceutical companies.

GAVI responded (on an unspecified date) by agreeing with MSF's goals, but regretting that MSF had discussed the issue in public as well as through its own close ties to GAVI. GAVI said that low prices required large, stable, high-volume deals, and "careful consideration and the support of key constituencies".

In January 2015, MSF also called upon GSK and Pfizer to cut the price of the pneumococcal vaccine to US$5 per child in developing countries, a price they estimated as competitive. On January 27, they responded to Pfizer's commitment to reduce prices by 6% to $10 per child. They said that GSK and Pfizer were being paid $21 per child if GAVI subsidies were included, and the change would not greatly increase affordability for mid-wealth countries, those too rich for GAVI help but too poor to afford the vaccine. They said that, as Pfizer had made $16 billion in profits on pneumococcal  vaccine in the last four years, a larger price cut would be affordable. In early 2016, they ran the "A fair shot" campaign to pressure GSK and Pfizer to drop prices. Pfizer said that they were already selling the vaccine at "far below" cost, while GSK said that the price enabled them to "just about" cover their costs, and "To discount it further would threaten our ability to supply it to these countries in the long-term".

Bill Gates responded to MSF, saying "I think there is an organisation that's wonderful in every other respect, but every time we raise money to save poor children's lives, they put out a press release that says the price of these things should be zero". He said that criticizing pharmaceutical company pricing deterred them from investing in medicines for the developing world, and said that instead, pharmaceutical companies should be praised for price discrimination: "We get a great price for these things, which is tiered pricing... And that's how we manage to cut childhood death in half". He also advocated improving low-temperature supply chains (a.k.a. cold chains) in developing countries.

In August 2019, MSF asked GAVI to stop giving Advance Market Commitment subsidies to GSK and Pfizer, whom they called a duopoly, and instead buy vaccine from a new third manufacturer, the Serum Institute of India, which offered the vaccine at 2/3 of the price then offered by the two. As the pneumococcal vaccine made up 40% of GAVI's vaccine purchasing costs, a 33% price drop would save GAVI billions (13% of its total vaccine purchasing costs). Pneumonia kills more than a quarter of children dying before the age of five, almost a million children each year. MSF said that GSK and Pfizer's pricing was exploitative and had left millions of children who could have been protected vulnerable. In December 2019, they reiterated this request, pointing out that the GSK/Pfizer pneumococcal vaccine often costs US$80 in middle-income countries too rich for GAVI support.

In January 2020, MSF repeated the appeal for Gavi to bulk-buy the cheaper pneumococcal vaccine and vaccinate more of the 55 million children who are not vaccinated with it. They also appealed to the World Health Organization, UNICEF, and the Gates Foundation, and said that Gavi could have done more to lower vaccine prices.

Health systems strengthening debate

In the 20-naughts, Gavi had intense internal debate about its role in vaccinations and in health systems strengthening (HSS). This was part of a broader discussion in healthcare about "vertical" approaches (often targeting specific diseases or behaviours) and "horizontal" ones, targeting broad programs such as primary care. At GAVI, some argued that vaccination could not be effectively carried out and sustained without strengthening healthcare, citing experiences in Gavi's vaccination programmes, where availability of staff, training, transport, and funds had hindered vaccination and reporting of vaccination coverage and stocks. There were also worries that Gavi was undermining and paralyzing health care systems. Others argued that HSS was a distraction from Gavi's single-minded focus on vaccines, and HSS was a nebulous concept that could not be defined and quantified.

Major donors Norway and Britain supported HSS; USAID and the Bill & Melinda Gates Foundation (and Bill Gates personally) opposed it. The majority of vaccine experts tended to favour technological rather than HSS-based approaches. Pharmaceutical industry representatives were supportive of HSS, possibly because they saw it as key to sustainable markets for their products. In 2005, a narrow vote brought Gavi to endorse an HSS goal. Up to a quarter of Gavi's funding was dedicated to "strengthening the capacity of integrated health systems to deliver immunisation", in practice it's been around 10%. After 2010, this funding went through a joint-venture Health Systems Funding Platform. Gavi's funding for this platform was conditional on the platform meeting vaccine coverage goals.

As of the mid-2010s, few in Gavi were working on HSS, most of the former pro-HSS people had left, and some at Gavi dismissed HSS as PR to gain support from pro-HSS donors and counter criticisms that Gavi was harming healthcare systems. Such criticisms were generally not a topic that GAVI engaged with internally; the lack of internal engagement with the issue has been criticized. The disagreements were fairly intense; when Bill Gates came to visit GAVI headquarters, employees would hide the HSS-related posters so that he would not be reminded of this aspect of GAVI's work. Julian Lob-Levitt, who was Gavi's CEO between 2004 and 2010, was rumoured to have left over conflicts around his support for health system strengthening. Seth Berkley has been the CEO of Gavi since 2011, .

It has been argued that GAVI's HSS spending in the early 2010s went to selective, disease-specific interventions repackaged as HSS. GAVI's HSS support at this time tended to focus on immunisation strengthening support, especially the building of cold chains. GAVI measured HSS using vaccination coverage as the sole indicator. It set the reporting indicators which were required of recipients of its funding; countries were not allowed to use similar indicators they already collected; this has been criticized for conferring a heavy accounting burden and diverting attention from indigenous goals. National government representatives did sit on the board, but had little influence; one European representative described the environment in the mid-2010s as "highly intimidating".

A 2016 funding-allocation analysis of a sample of GAVI grants found that just over half the money went to purchasing drugs, equipment, supplies, and facilities (and 3% on bonuses and incentive pay,). These are short-term funding activities which the WHO does not consider HSS. The proportions were higher in less-developed healthcare systems. There was no spending on operational research, improving use of existing resources, or developing national drug and vaccine policies. In some grants, HSS funds were mostly spent on day-to-day operational costs, with no exit plan for the funding. GAVI subsequently (before 2018) shifted HSS aid to focus more on sustainability and the principles of the Paris Declaration for Aid Effectiveness.

Market shaping
In 2011 Gavi added "shape the market for vaccines and other immunisation supplies" to its strategic goals.

Pentavalent vaccine
GAVI spent 15 years (2005–2020) with a program for shaping the pentavalent vaccine market to be more stable and competitive. The vaccine price fell with increased competition, and price discrimination declined. Whether Gavi met quantitative goals will be assessed in 2020.

COVID-19 pandemic
In April 2020, Gavi's CEO Seth Berkley commented that the COVID-19 pandemic needed a global response whereby the best global facilities for separate parts of the processes should then be integrated into a global process. He said he hoped that the G20 countries should work together with a budget of tens of billions of dollars, and that individual countries should be prepared for finished vaccines to be allocated according to greatest need.

In September 2020, Gavi was announced as one of the organisations leading the COVAX vaccine allocation plan, created to ensure that any new COVID-19 vaccine would be shared equally between the world's richest and poorest countries.

The following month, Gavi announced the approval of up to $150 million to help 92 low- and middle-income countries prepare for the delivery of future COVID-19 vaccines, including technical assistance and cold chain equipment.

In January 2021, Seth Berkley announced that Gavi hoped to deliver 145 to 150 million doses of COVID-19 vaccines in the first quarter of 2021 and 500 million doses in the second quarter, and then 1.5 billion in the second half of the year.

In January 2022, the Washington Post reported that following 309 million coronavirus vaccine doses being delivered in December 2021, COVAX had delivered approximately 910 million doses in 2021.

Awards
Gavi was awarded the 2019 Lasker-Bloomberg Public Service Award for "providing sustained access to childhood vaccines around the globe, thus saving millions of lives, and for highlighting the power of immunization to prevent disease".

Gavi was nominated for the 2021 Nobel Peace Prize by Norwegian MP Carl-Erik Grimstad.

Gavi was awarded the Sunhak Peace Prize in 2022 for Promoting vaccine equity at the forefront of COVID-19 by leading COVAX and Improving overall health of humanity by increasing access to vaccine for children in vulnerable countries.

See also

 CEPI
 COVAX
 Economics of vaccines
 Vaccine resistance
 Vaccine equity

References

External links

 
 GAVI Vaccine Fund

International medical and health organizations
Vaccination-related organizations
International responses to the COVID-19 pandemic
Organizations established in 2000